The Ethnic and Religious Affairs Committee of the Chinese People's Political Consultative Conference is one of ten special committees of the Chinese People's Political Consultative Conference, China's top political advisory body and a central part of the Chinese Communist Party's united front system.

History 
The Ethnic and Religious Affairs Committee was created in March 1995 during the 8th Chinese People's Political Consultative Conference.

List of chairpersons

References 

Special committees of the Chinese People's Political Consultative Conference
Organizations established in 1995
1995 establishments in China